The Ottawa Cliffsides were a senior ice hockey team that played in the Inter-Provincial Amateur Hockey Union from 1908–1911. From 1905 to 1908 they played in the Ottawa City Senior League.

They were the first winner of the Allan Cup in 1909 when the cup was given to the winner of the Inter-Provincial Hockey League. Alf Smith coached the Ottawa Cliffsides to win the first Allan Cup in March 1909, only to lose it to Queen's University in a challenge.

The Cliffsides played for only three seasons in the Inter-Provincial league. They then reappeared in the Ottawa City Senior League in 1919–20 before disappearing for good.

Season-by-season results

Inter-Provincial Amateur Hockey Union

Ottawa City Senior League

Notable players
Punch Broadbent
Jack Darragh
Horace Merrill
Coo Dion
Arthur Sixsmith
Norman Scott
Alec Connell

References

Notes

Ice hockey teams in Ontario
Cli